Lee Mullican (December 2, 1919 – July 8, 1998) was an American painter, curator, and art teacher. He was an influential member of the Dynaton Movement.

Early life and education 
Lee Mullican was born on December 2, 1919 in Chickasha, Oklahoma. He studied at the Abilene Christian University in Texas, the University of Oklahoma, and the Kansas City Art Institute.

During World War II, he was in the United States Army and served in Hawaii.

Career and late life 
He moved to San Francisco after the war in 1947. Mullican was part of a 1951 exhibition called "Dynaton" held at the San Francisco Museum of Art. Mullican was a member of the UCLA School of the Arts and Architecture faculty from 1962 to 1990.

His paintings were abstract and have a "rigid" and "linear" quality to them. He applied paint with a printer's knife. Mullicans work was influenced by cosmology, which is also a trait found in other Dynaton artists work.

Mullican married artist Luchita Hurtado and they had two sons. Their son Matt Mullican is an artist; and their son John Mullican is a writer and director. He died on July 8, 1998 in Santa Monica, California. In 2008, his son John Mullican released the documentary film, Finding Lee Mullican.

References

Further reading 
Eliel, Carol S., Lee Mullican, Amy Gerstler, and Lari Pittman. Lee Mullican an abundant harvest of sun (Los Angeles County Museum of Art: Los Angeles, 2005) 
McCollum, Allan,"The Drawing Appears," in Lee Mullican: Selected Drawings, 1945-1980. University of California, Los Angeles (1999).
Lee Mullican, "Selected Works," published by Galerie Schreiner, 1980

External links
Oral history interview with Lee Mullican, 1992 May 22-1993 Mar. 4, from Archives of American Art, Smithsonian Institution.
Interview of Lee Mullican, part of Los Angeles Art Community - Group Portrait interview series, Center for Oral History Research, UCLA Library Special Collections, University of California, Los Angeles.

1919 births
1998 deaths
Abstract painters
People from Chickasha, Oklahoma
20th-century American painters
American male painters
UCLA School of the Arts and Architecture faculty
Artists from Taos, New Mexico
Artists from California
20th-century American male artists